Henry Marlborough (fl. 1383–1386) was an English politician.

He was a Member (MP) of the Parliament of England for Guildford in November 1383 and 1386. Beyond this, nothing further is recorded of him.

References

Year of birth missing
Year of death missing
English MPs October 1383
Members of Parliament for Guildford
English MPs 1386